Qareh Kanlu (also Romanized as Qareh Kānlū, Qarīkanlū, and Qorīkānlū; also known as Rīkānlū) is a village in Badranlu Rural District, in the Central District of Bojnord County, North Khorasan Province, Iran. At the 2006 census, its population was 504, in 116 families.

References 

Populated places in Bojnord County